Croespenmaen is a locality near Crumlin, Caerphilly, Wales. The nearby Croespenmaen Industrial Estate is the site of Unilever's Pot Noodle factory, which became the topic of a 2006 advertising campaign, showing fictitious Pot Noodle mines in Wales. The factory typically produces 155 million pots annually. Croespenmaen is also the site of the Brace's Bakery factory.

References 

Villages in Caerphilly County Borough